Genarp is a locality situated in Lund Municipality, Skåne County, Sweden with 2,892 inhabitants in 2010. It is the southernmost urban area in Lund Municipality, located in Bara Hundred.

Most of Genarp consists of residential areas with single-family homes. Genarp Church, which is located in the village, is the only church built in Skåne during the 16th century.

Björnstorp Castle, Toppeladugård Castle and Häckeberga Castle are all located close to Genarp.

References 

Populated places in Skåne County
Populated places in Lund Municipality